Fareham is a constituency in Hampshire represented in the House of Commons of the UK Parliament. Since 2015, it has been represented by Suella Braverman of the Conservative Party.

Constituency profile
The largest town is Fareham and other communities include Portchester, Locks Heath, Warsash and Titchfield. There are many commuters to Southampton and Portsmouth. The Royal Navy and Merchant Navy have training facilities. Residents are wealthier than the UK average.

Boundaries 

1885–1918: The Municipal Boroughs of Portsmouth and Southampton, the Sessional Division of Fareham, and part of the Sessional Division of Southampton.

1918–1950: The Urban Districts of Fareham, Gosport and Alverstoke, Havant, and Warblington, and the Rural Districts of Fareham and Havant.

1974–1983: The Urban District of Fareham.

1983–1997: The Borough of Fareham except the wards of Hill Head and Stubbington, and the City of Winchester wards of Boarhunt and Southwick, Curdridge, Denmead, Droxford Soberton and Hambledon, Shedfield, Swanmore, Waltham Chase, and Wickham.

1997–present: The Borough of Fareham wards of Fareham North, Fareham North-West, Fareham South, Fareham West, Locks Heath, Park Gate, Portchester East, Portchester West, Sarisbury, Titchfield, Titchfield Common, and Warsash.

History 
The constituency was first created in 1885. In January 1905 the Liberal Party employed Bertha Bowness Foulkes who was Britains second constituency woman political agent. The constituency  was abolished in 1950 to form the constituency of Gosport and Fareham. It was revived again in 1974.  The constituency has always been represented by Conservatives.

Members of Parliament

MPs 1885–1950

MPs since 1974

Elections

Elections in the 2010s

Elections in the 2000s

Elections in the 1990s

Elections in the 1980s

Elections in the 1970s

Elections in the 1940s

Elections in the 1930s

Elections in the 1920s

Election results 1885-1918

Elections in the 1880s

Elections in the 1890s

Elections in the 1900s

Elections in the 1910s 

General Election 1914–15:

Another General Election was required to take place before the end of 1915. The political parties had been making preparations for an election to take place and by July 1914, the following candidates had been selected; 
Unionist: Arthur Lee
Liberal:

See also 
 List of parliamentary constituencies in Hampshire

Notes

References

Sources 

Fareham
Parliamentary constituencies in Hampshire
Constituencies of the Parliament of the United Kingdom established in 1885
Constituencies of the Parliament of the United Kingdom disestablished in 1950
Constituencies of the Parliament of the United Kingdom established in 1974